The 21st Buil Film Awards ceremony was hosted by the Busan-based daily newspaper Busan Ilbo. It was held on October 5, 2012 at the Haeundae Grand Hotel's Grand Ballroom in Busan, and was emceed by director Kwak Kyung-taek and actress Ye Ji-won.

Nominations and winners
Complete list of nominees and winners:

(Winners denoted in bold)

References

External links 
 

Buil Film Awards
Buil Film Awards
Buil Film Awards
October 2012 events in South Korea